Binary Alignment Map (BAM) is the comprehensive raw data of genome sequencing; it consists of the lossless, compressed binary representation of the Sequence Alignment Map-files.

BAM is the compressed binary representation of SAM (Sequence Alignment Map), a compact and index-able representation of nucleotide sequence alignments. The goal of indexing is to retrieve alignments that overlap a specific location quickly without having to go through all of them. Before indexing, BAM must be sorted by reference ID and then leftmost coordinate. BAM is in compressed BGZF format.

The structure of BAM files include a header section and an alignment section:

 Header—The sample name, sample length, and alignment method are all included in this section. The alignments section contains alignments that are linked to specific information in the header section.
 Alignments—The read name, read sequence, read quality, alignment information, and custom tags are all included in this file. The chromosome, start coordinate, alignment quality, and match descriptor string are all included in the read name.
 Alignment Section includes the following:
 Read Group (RG)
 Barcode Tag (BC)
 Single-end alignment quality (SM)
 Paired-end alignment quality (AS)
 Edit distance tag (NM)
 Amplicon name tag (XN)
Bam format uses 0-based coordinate system, where as SAM uses 1-based coordinate system. BAM can represent values in the range [−2^31 , 2^32).

To view a list of sequencing and analysis tools that work with SAM/BAM click here.

See also 
 FASTQ format
 SAM format
 SAMtools
 CRAM format
 List of file formats for molecular biology
 Compression of Genomic Sequencing Data

External links
 SAM format specification

Genomics

References